Mohammedia District is a district located in Mascara Province, northwestern Algeria.
It is located about 70 km from Oran and 420 km from Algiers. The seat of the district is the town of Mohammadia.

Municipalities
The district is further divided into 6 municipalities:
Mohammadia
El Ghomri
Ferraguig
Mocta Douz
Sedjerara
Sidi Abdelmoumen

Districts of Mascara Province